The Pastor Garafiano is a Spanish breed of sheep dog native to the island of La Palma in the Canary Islands. The name comes from the comarca of Garafía, in the north of the island, where the breed was most common, although specimens can be found throughout the island. The breed was officially recognized by the Real Sociedad Canina de España in 2003.

History 

This is a distinct canine population, it is a native to the comarca of Garafía, on the island of La Palma, where it was used by shepherds to bring the herds of goats. Because of this, the animal thrives well in steep and rocky areas. It has very heterogeneous characteristics, because there has only been performed a functional selection. Its core competency is the grazing of goats and sheep in rugged terrain, by the geography of La Palma. Its origin lies the pre-Hispanic times, although the crossings with other races (most importantly the Belgian shepherds) after the conquest contributed to the development of the Pastor Garafiano.

For a time, this breed was on the verge of disappearing due to out-breeding with other dog breeds. Successive crosses, especially from 1960s with other breeds of shepherd dogs, demonstrated the necessity to work for its recovery and selection from the few pure specimens of the race that kept the shepherds of the island. To avoid the disappearance of the dog breed the working group to recovery of the Pastor garafiano was created, which became the Spanish association of the Pastor Garafiano Dog. Among the objectives of the association are the censuses, the creation of breeding centers, the participation in dog shows and fairs, etc.

The breed has been brought in samples of indigenous breeds that have been held in the Canary Islands, as well as international exhibitions held in Santa Cruz de Tenerife and Las Palmas. The Department of Ethnology of the School of Veterinary of the University of Las Palmas de Gran Canaria has conducted several studies on the breed, which were presented at the symposium of indigenous breeds held in Córdoba in March 1992.

Features

Body
Lupoid, medium proportions or moderately rangy, well balanced, medium to large. The rump slightly higher than the cross, rather short neck and small head in relation to the body.

Weight
Specimens typically weigh between 28 and 35 kg for males and between 24 and 30 kg for females. These are the weights that were given before, currently the weight is 35 to 46 kg for males and 25 to 35 kilos for females.

Height
The height at the withers of males is between 57 and 64 cm, whereas in females between 55 and 62 cm. Currently, this data also changed to 60–70 cm for males and 55-65 for females.

Head
Conical, relatively small compared to the body, slightly curved front, which highlights for the somewhat back implantation and separated from the ears, that may be split or prone split to forward. May also appear erect, observing then a tendency to keep them folded to any stimulus, showing its inner face.
The nose is always black. Eyes are oblique, almond-shaped and brown. Short collected lips. Pincer bite. Stop soft and very pronounced.

Legs
The legs are strong, well-positioned, highlighting further for its proportions. Sometimes it has spurs, which are often double and some implanted.

Hair

The coat is tawny or alobada. Puppies are born brown, changing color as adults, appearing in some cases white hairs or spots on the chest, toes or tail tip, usually disappearing to grow.

The hair is abundant and more or less long. Sometimes it is soft while in other cases it is rough. It accumulates at the base of the ears, neck, tails, tail and the edges of the legs. The tail is usually crowded with hair, taking sabre shape being slightly curled, but never on the back.

Temperament
The character of Pastor Garafiano is docile and friendly. When it meets strangers shows a typical attitude: barking, folding ears, tail movements and turns in the head showing the corner of its mouth in a smile. It is quiet and restful appearance but it becomes very active while performing any physical activity.

See also
 Dogs portal
 List of dog breeds

References

External links 

 Official Association  Pastor Garafiano
 Inclusion in BOE

Dog breeds originating in the Canary Islands
La Palma
Herding dogs